Uroosa Siddiqui is a Pakistani television actress and comedian. She is best known for her role as Sukhi in Baraat series and got her first leading role in 3rd season of Baraat series Takkay Ki Ayegi Baraat. Her Other notable works include Shagufta Jahan in Quddusi Sahab Ki Bewah, Sana in Dramay Baziyan, and Zohra Jabeen in Hum Sab Ajeeb Se Hain and Warda Ahmed in Fun Khana for which she won Hum Award for Best Actor in Comic Role. Currently, she is playing a role of Bemisaal in Dolly Darling airing on Geo Entertainment.

Personal life
Siddiqui married Saqib Khan in December 2015.

Television

References

External links 

Living people
Year of birth missing (living people)